Robert Melvin Rapson (August 3, 1935 – July 14, 2015) was an American college football coach. He was the head coach of Maranatha Baptist Bible College in Watertown, Wisconsin from 1974 to 1978, compiling a record of 19–19–1 and winning two conference championships.

Rapson played college football at Taylor University, earning varsity letters in 1957 and 1958.

Head coaching record

References

1935 births
2015 deaths
Maranatha Baptist Bible Sabercats football coaches
Taylor Trojans football players
People from Bad Axe, Michigan